Olearia elliptica subsp. praetermissa is a flowering plant in the family Asteraceae. The subspecific epithet means "overlooked", referring to the fact that this distinctive endemic subspecies was long overlooked.

Description
It is a shrub, often stunted, growing to 1 m in height. The alternate leaves are usually 25–35 mm long and 10–15 mm wide. The white, daisy-like flowers are 10 mm across, appearing from mid May to early October. The fruits are 2–3 mm long, with numerous bristles.

Distribution and habitat
The subspecies is endemic to Australia's subtropical Lord Howe Island in the Tasman Sea. There it is found growing in pockets of soil on rocky ledges in the mountains at higher elevations.

References

elliptica subsp. praetermissa
Asterales of Australia
Endemic flora of Lord Howe Island
Plants described in 1993
Plant subspecies